Fakhr-e Davud (also Romanized as Fakhr-e Dāvūd; also known as Ribāt-i-Fakhr-i-Dāūd, Robāţ, and Robāţ-e Fakhr-e Dāvūd) is a village in Piveh Zhan Rural District, Ahmadabad District, Mashhad County, Razavi Khorasan Province, Iran. At the 2006 census, its population was 756, in 215 families.

References 

Populated places in Mashhad County